The Sechura language, also known as Sek, is an extinct language spoken in the Piura Region of Peru, near the port of Sechura. It appears to have become extinct by the beginning of the 20th century. The only documentation is that of an 1863 wordlist by Richard Spruce, as well as a word list by Bishop Martínez Compañón (1782–1790).

Classification
Sechura is too poorly known to be definitively classified. Kaufman notes that a connection between Sechura and the Catacaoan languages is likely and is supported by lexical evidence.

Sek family
Rivet groups Sechura and Tallán together under the same Sek when he compares them to the Catacaoan languages.  In comparing wordlists from Sechura and Tallán, Torero finds six likely cognates between the two:

However, Glottolog says the data is not compelling.

Vocabulary

Martínez Compañón (1782-1790)
Below are sample Sechura words from a manuscript (currently held in Madrid) by Bishop Martínez Compañón (1782-1790). There is another copy of the manuscript currently held in Bogotá, which Urban (2019) considers to be less reliable and not the original.

{| class="wikitable"
! gloss !! Sechura
|-
| ‘man’ || succla; sucda (?)
|-
| ‘heart’ || chusiopunma
|-
| ‘father’ || jàchi
|-
| ‘sister’ || bapueñi
|-
| ‘moon’ || ñangru
|-
| ‘trunk’ || fucù
|-
| ‘grass’ || unñiòcòl
|-
| ‘rain’ || purir
|}

Spruce (1863)
Below is Richard Spruce's 1863 Sechura word list as transcribed by Matthias Urban (2015). Some transcriptions are uncertain, with alternative transcriptions following semicolons.

{| class="wikitable sortable"
! gloss !! Sechura
|-
| ‘man’ || recla
|-
| ‘woman’ || cucatama
|-
| ‘son or daughter’ || ñosma
|-
| ‘dog’ || tono
|-
| ‘hawk’ || kilkil
|-
| ‘serpent’ || kon’mpar
|-
| ‘lizard’ || ludac
|-
| ‘fish’ || xuma
|-
| ‘head’ || teuma
|-
| ‘stomach’ || puesa
|-
| ‘foot’ || lava
|-
| ‘eye’ || uchi
|-
| ‘nose’ || chuna
|-
| ‘mouth’ || collo
|-
| ‘hearing’ || tapa; fapa
|-
| ‘water’ || xoto
|-
| ‘light’ || yura
|-
| ‘maize’ || llumash
|-
| ‘sweet potato’ || chapru
|-
| ‘road’ || yuvirma
|-
| ‘come here!’ || xoroc tima; xoroc tema
|-
| ‘be quiet!’ || neshi
|-
| ‘come along’ || uchan; uchau
|-
| ‘no’ || shushca
|-
| ‘yes’ || yé
|-
| ‘turkey, buzzard’ || roncho
|-
| ‘beach’ || coyu roro
|-
| ‘cotton’ || sono; suno
|-
| ‘devil’ || ñash
|-
| ‘good day’ || amatioo
|-
| ‘how are you?’ || ubruncuma
|-
| ‘face’ || re
|-
| ‘sea’ || taholma
|-
| ‘pot’ || pillacala
|-
| ‘father in law’ || ratichma; rutichma
|-
| ‘mother in law’ || naminma 
|-
| ‘where is your husband?’ || xamanmi recla
|-
| ‘here it is’ || cha
|}

References

Languages of Peru
Language isolates of South America